Hesperomannia (island-aster) is a genus of flowering plant in the family Asteraceae.

Hesperomannia is endemic to Hawaii and consists of four species:
Hesperomannia arborescens (Lanai hesperomannia)
Hesperomannia arbuscula (Maui hesperomannia)
Hesperomannia lydgatei (Kauai hesperomannia)
Hesperomannia swezeyi

Although traditionally classified in the tribe Mutisieae, molecular evidence shows that it belongs in the tribe Vernonieae, most closely related to the African Vernonia species.

References

 
Asteraceae genera
Endemic flora of Hawaii
Taxonomy articles created by Polbot